hit106.9 (call sign: 2XXX) is a commercial FM radio station broadcasting in Newcastle, New South Wales, Australia, on a frequency of 106.9 MHz, and is part of Southern Cross Austereo's Hit Network. Triple M is a sister station sharing the same building.

History

hit106.9's history can be traced back to Singleton radio station 2SI, owned by Alex Mather (VK2JZ) and the Singleton Argus newspaper which never went to air.  The licence was obtained by Hunter River Broadcasters Pty. Ltd. and changed to 2HR. The station launched on 30 August 1937. Shareholders included the Singleton Argus and the Robinson Family. Three years later, the station was moved to Maitland, with transmitter at Lochinvar.

In those days, 2HR operated on 680 kHz with 300 watts of power, and was affiliated with the Macquarie Broadcasting Network. Programs were originated locally between 6:30 am and 6:30 pm, before taking the Macquarie feed at 6:30 pm.

In the 1950s, 2HR was relocated to Newcastle, with its transmitter located in Bolwarra. Station manager Ken Robinson was a former Army officer, and his identification number had the letters NX. Therefore, the station was given the callsign 2NX, and a new frequency at 1360 kHz .

In 1971, 2NX's owners Hunter Broadcasters were purchased by the Catholic Broadcasting Company, owned by the Catholic Church. 2NX programming still was relayed to 2NM overnight during this time, and was identified as 2NXNM.

In the early 1990s, the Catholic Church got out of broadcasting, and sold 2NX to Radio Newcastle, which was later taken over by Austereo, and then sold a 50% stake to RG Capital Radio Network (which was taken over by Macquarie Bank). 2NX was granted a license to convert to FM in the '90s and moved to 106.9 MHz, branding itself originally as X107, before changing to NXFM. In April 2011 Southern Cross Media bought out Austereo for more than 700 million giving Southern Cross Media full ownership of NX FM.

On 15 December 2016, NXFM became known as hit106.9 in Southern Cross Austereo's mass re-branding of its regional radio network.

Hit 106.9 are a sponsor of local A-League team the Newcastle Jets.

Current On-Air Schedule 
Weekdays:
 Nick, Jess & Ducko 6:00am to 9:00am
 Seany B 9:00am to 1:00pm
 Pez 1:00pm to 3:00pm
 Carrie & Tommy 3:00pm to 6:00pm
 Hughesy, Ed & Erin 6:00pm to 7:00pm
 Hot Nights with Abbie Chatfield 7:00pm to 9:00pm
 Jimmy & Nath 9:00pm to 11:00pm

Saturdays:
 Up Early with Jimmy & Nath 7:00am to 9:00am
 Various Announcers 9:00am to 7:00pm
 Saturday Night Party Playlist 7:00pm to 12:00am

Sundays:
 Up Early with Jimmy & Nath 7:00am to 9:00am
 Various Announcers 9:00am to 7:00pm
 Australian Music 7:00pm to 12:00am

NXFMs logo 2005–2016

References

External links 
 NXFM

Radio stations in Newcastle, New South Wales
Contemporary hit radio stations in Australia
Southern Cross Media Group
Radio stations established in 1937